James or Jim Cain may refer to:

James M. Cain (1892–1977), American journalist and novelist
James P. Cain (born 1957), former politically appointed American diplomat
James David Cain (born 1938), Louisiana politician
Jim Cain (defensive end)  (1927–2001), American player of gridiron football
Jim Cain (tackle) (born 1939), Canadian football player
Jim Cain (ice hockey) (1902–1962), Canadian ice hockey player
James Cain (Isle of Man politician) (born 1954), Manx Speaker of the House of Keys
James D. Cain Jr. (born 1964), United States federal judge
J. V. Cain (1951–1979), tight end

See also
James Caine (disambiguation)
James Caan (disambiguation)
James Cane (disambiguation)
Jim Kane (disambiguation)
James Cayne (born 1934), businessman